Chang Chen Ghost Stories is a 2015 Chinese suspense thriller film directed by Zhengchao Xu. It was released on July 3, 2015.

Cast
Hans Zhang
Li Zhang
Li Xin'ai
Haoran Zhang
Ryan Zhu
Wei Kong
Frank Fan

Reception

Box office
The film earned  at the Chinese box office.

References

External links

Chinese thriller films
2010s thriller films
Chinese suspense films